Tyler Bunz (born February 11, 1992) is a Canadian former ice hockey goaltender who last played as a prospect within the Edmonton Oilers organization of the National Hockey League (NHL). Bunz was selected by the Edmonton Oilers in the 5th round (121st overall) of the 2010 NHL Entry Draft.

On March 19, 2012, the Oilers signed Bunz to a three-year entry-level contract.

On March 22, 2014, Bunz was hit in the throat by a puck, leading to a life-threatening injury. He recovered from his injury without needing surgery, and resumed his playing career.

In the 2014–15 season, on April 2, 2015, Bunz made his NHL debut against the Los Angeles Kings. He substituted in for Ben Scrivens, who had given up 5 goals, to start the third period. Bunz surrendered 3 goals on 12 shots and the Kings routed the Oilers 8–2.'

Career statistics

Awards and honours

See also
 List of players who played only one game in the NHL

References

External links

1992 births
Living people
Bakersfield Condors (1998–2015) players
Canadian ice hockey goaltenders
Edmonton Oilers draft picks
Edmonton Oilers players
Ice hockey people from Alberta
Medicine Hat Tigers players
Oklahoma City Barons players
Sportspeople from St. Albert, Alberta
Stockton Thunder players
Wichita Thunder players